Rockford Township is one of twelve townships in Floyd County, Iowa, United States.  As of the 2000 census, its population was 1,331.

Geography
According to the United States Census Bureau, Rockford Township covers an area of 42.43 square miles (109.89 square kilometers).

Cities, towns, villages
 Rockford

Adjacent townships
 Rock Grove Township (north)
 Rudd Township (northeast)
 Ulster Township (east)
 Union Township (southeast)
 Scott Township (south)
 Owen Township, Cerro Gordo County (west)
 Portland Township, Cerro Gordo County (northwest)

Cemeteries
The township contains Riverside Cemetery.

Major highways
  Iowa Highway 147

School districts
 Nora Springs-Rock Falls Community School District
 Rudd-Rockford-Marble Rock Community School District

Political districts
 Iowa's 2nd congressional district
 State House District 60
 State Senate District 30

References
 United States Census Bureau 2008 TIGER/Line Shapefiles
 United States Board on Geographic Names (GNIS)
 United States National Atlas

External links
 US-Counties.com
 City-Data.com

Townships in Floyd County, Iowa
Townships in Iowa